The Charlestown Vietnam Veterans Memorial is a war memorial commemorating six local men who died who during the Vietnam War, installed outside Veterans Memorial Hall in Charlestown, Boston, in the U.S. state of Massachusetts. The memorial was dedicated in April 2009.

See also
 List of Vietnam War monuments and memorials

References

External links
 
 Vietnam War Memorial, Veterans Memorial Hall, Charlestown, MA, USA at Waymarking

2009 establishments in Massachusetts
2009 sculptures
Charlestown, Boston
Monuments and memorials in Boston
Outdoor sculptures in Boston
Sculptures of men in Massachusetts
Vietnam War monuments and memorials in the United States